Khaled Tareq Bashir (Arabic:خالد طارق بشير) (born 15 July 1995) is an Emirati footballer who plays as a midfielder.

References

External links
 

Emirati footballers
1993 births
Living people
Association football midfielders
Al-Wasl F.C. players
Al Ahli Club (Dubai) players
Baniyas Club players
Al-Taawon (UAE) Club players
UAE First Division League players
UAE Pro League players